Galgahévíz is a village in Pest county, Hungary.

International relations

Twin towns – Sister cities
Galgahévíz is twinned with:
  Rahden in  Germany

References

Populated places in Pest County